Lam Tei is an at-grade MTR Light Rail stop located at Castle Peak Road in Tuen Mun District, near Lam Tei. It began service on 18 September 1988 and belongs to Zone 3.

References

External links

MTR Light Rail stops
Former Kowloon–Canton Railway stations
Lam Tei
Railway stations in Hong Kong opened in 1988